The Daddy of 'Em All is an album by American country singer Ernest Tubb, released in 1957.

Reception

In his AllMusic review, Bruce Eder called The Daddy of 'Em All "... one of the great honky tonk long-players of its era."

Track listing
"You're Breaking My Heart" (H. H. Melka)
"I Dreamed of an Old Love Affair" (Jimmie Davis, Bonnie Dodd, Charles Mitchell)
"I Know My Baby Loves Me in Her Own Peculiar Way" (Riley Shepard, Don Canton)
"Mississippi Gal" (Taylor McPeters, Daniel Cypert, Sam Nicols)
"When a Soldier Knocks and Finds Nobody Home" (Ernest Tubb, Moon Mullican, Lou Wayne)
"Daisy Mae" (Floyd Tillman)
"I've Got the Blues for Mammy" (Hy Heath, William Daugherty)
"This Troubled Friend of Mine" (Billy Hughes, Johnny Tyler)
"I Knew the Moment I Lost You" (Bob Wills, Tommy Duncan)
"You're the Only Good Thing" (Jack Toombs, Chuck Gregory)
"My Hillbilly Baby" (Rex Griffin)
"There's No Fool Like a Young Fool" (Bette Thomasson)

Personnel
Ernest Tubb – vocals, guitar
Billy Byrd – guitar
Rusty Gabbard – pedal steel guitar
Jack Drake – bass
Buddy Harman – drums
Tommy Jackson – fiddle
Owen Bradley – piano
Floyd Cramer – piano

References

Ernest Tubb albums
1957 albums
Decca Records albums
Albums produced by Paul Cohen (record producer)